Johnson&Jonson is the debut studio album from American hip hop duo, Johnson&Jonson (Blu and Mainframe). It was released on September 23, 2008 by Tres Records.

Background 
The album was originally named Powders & Oils and had 21 tracks instead of 16. The Powders & Oils mix is expected to be officially released sometime in the future, as well as "Kinda' Busty" 12", "Mama Told Me"/"Hold On John" 12", and "The Only Way/"Half A Knot" 12".

Track listing

References

2008 debut albums
Hip hop albums by American artists